The DVE Morning Show (currently branded Randy Baumann and the DVE Morning Show) is a morning radio comedy and variety show broadcast on Pittsburgh classic rock station 102.5 FM WDVE featuring DJ  Randy Baumann. The show began airing in the 6:00-10:00 am weekday morning drive slot in late 1986 after the cancellation of Jimmy and Steve in the Morning (from which the show draws inspiration). Originally hosted by Scott Paulsen, the show would go on to be hosted by the team of Paulsen and Jim Krenn from 1988 to 1999, briefly by Krenn solo, then by the team of Krenn and Baumann from 2000 to 2011. Since late December 2012, Baumann has hosted with comedian Bill Crawford, sportscaster Mike Prisuta, and news anchor Val Porter. Additionally, many newsreaders, sportscasters and other members have come and gone during the show's run. 

In its nearly thirty years of existence, the DVE Morning Show has consistently remained one of the most popular morning radio shows in the Pittsburgh radio market. Though the show has changed personnel several times, the same basic formula of comedy bits, celebrity impersonations, telephone interviews, in-studio guests, unusual news items, sports coverage and promotion of local music and comedy has remained and been the key to the show's continued success.

History
In 1980, WDVE began airing Jimmy and Steve in the Morning with DJs and hosts Jimmy Roach and Steve Hansen. Roach and Hansen re-established comedy and local music promotion on Pittsburgh morning radio, elements that had been absent from the region's airwaves for quite some time. They helped to promote the careers of Pittsburgh area acts like the Iron City Houserockers, the Granati Brothers, Donnie Iris and the Cruisers and B. E. Taylor Group. This formula of comedy, talk and local music helped to make the show and station extremely popular in the region. Despite this, WDVE did not renew their contracts in 1986, and Roach and Hansen were fired, effectively canceling Jimmy and Steve in the Morning.

Not long after Roach and Hansen's departure from WDVE, the station replaced them and their show. Hiring comedian/DJ Scott Paulsen, the station began airing Scott Paulsen and the DVE Morning Show in the 6:00-10:00 am time slot. Adopting a similar format to Roach and Hansen, Paulsen's show became very popular and kept WDVE near the top of the ratings. In 1988, Paulsen was teamed up with comedian Jim Krenn, who had been a regular on the show. Paulsen and Krenn even competed against Roach and Hansen from 1987 to 1991, when the latter duo joined WMYG. When Jimmy Roach and Steve Hansen went separate ways in 1991, Scott Paulsen, Jim Krenn and the DVE Morning Show became Pittsburgh's most popular morning radio program.

Over the next decade, Paulsen and Krenn created many comedic characters, sketches and celebrity impersonations. They interviewed many regular guests and continued to promote Pittsburgh music and comedy. At the end of 1999, Scott Paulsen decided to not renew his contract and leave WDVE and the Morning Show (he would return later in 2000 until 2006 as a DJ).  For a temporary period of time in 2000, Krenn hosted solo and the show was rebranded Jim Krenn and the DVE Morning Show.  After interviewing several candidates, Krenn and WDVE selected Erie, Pennsylvania native and radio personality Randy Baumann. The program was again rebranded, this time Jim Krenn, Randy Baumann and the DVE Morning Show, and the show remained popular in the ratings. 

Over the show's run, several newsreaders and sportscasters have come and gone. However, newsreader Val Porter and sportscaster Mike Prisuta have been with the show since the early 2000s. Phil Kirzyc, later the DJ for the weekday 7:00 pm–12:00 am time slot, got his start at WDVE as the Morning Show'''s announcer.

For a period of a month in January and February 2010, Randy Baumann did not appear with Jim Krenn on the program because of a contract dispute, and the show was temporarily rebranded The DVE Morning Show. Negotiations were eventually settled, and Baumann returned to Jim Krenn, Randy Baumann and the DVE Morning Show. 

In December 2011 and January 2012, a member of the Morning Show again went through a contract dispute. This time, it was Jim Krenn's turn. WDVE wanted Krenn to leave the Morning Show and become the station's spokesperson, as well as become more of an internet personality. Krenn wanted to remain in his current position as host of the program. As a result of this, Jim Krenn was forced to leave WDVE and the Morning Show after twenty-five years on the air. Because of a non-compete clause in his contract, Krenn has not yet returned to Pittsburgh's airwaves. He has since returned to focus on his standup while also hosting an internet podcast, Jim Krenn: No Restrictions, which began streaming in March 2013. Krenn would eventually return to Pittsburgh radio, albeit on a weekly basis, joining Larry Richert and John Shumway on Fridays from 8:00-9:00 am on KDKA-AM.

During Krenn's dispute with WDVE and parent company Clear Channel Communications, the program returned to the air from its holiday break with Baumann, Val Porter and Mike Prisuta, again retitled The DVE Morning Show. In January 2012, it was announced that Scott Paulsen would return to the show as an "executive contributor" as well as a fill-in host/DJ. Comedian Bill Crawford was also hired to join the show. When Paulsen and Crawford joined the show later that month, the show was rebranded Randy Baumann and the DVE Morning Show, with Baumann currently as the show's sole host. 

On January 31, 2014, Scott Paulsen again signed off from the Morning Show, two years after he returned to the station., citing he wanted to  spend more time on his farm and, jokingly, become a woman. He and the other Morning Show members hinted at possibly becoming a guest contributor in the future  

As a testament to the program's popularity, WDVE often reruns bits from the Morning Show at other times during the day. DVE disc jockeys Michele Michaels (10:00 am–3:00 pm) and Chad Tyson (3:00-8:00 pm) often play recent clips from the show intermittently during their respective times on air. Additionally, every Saturday from 8:00-10:00 am, the station airs The DVE Morning Show Reloaded featuring the best of the previous week's shows interjected in between songs. This is usually hosted by Val Porter.

On-air personnel

Current
 Randy Baumann, host (2000–present) 
 Val Porter, newsreader (2001–present)
 Mike Prisuta, sportscaster (2002–present)
 Bill Crawford, comedian (2012–present)

Former
 Scott Paulsen, host (1986-1999) and executive contributor/fill-in host (2012-2014)
 Jim Krenn, host (1988-2011)
 Phil Kirzyc, sports, later news (1988-1996)
 Dani Coates, newsreader (?-1996)
 Cris Winter, newsreader (1996-2001)
 Eddy Crow, sportscaster (1996-2002)

Frequent guests
 Joe Bartnick, Pittsburgh-native comedian
 Charlie Batch, Pittsburgh Steelers Radio Network and former Steelers quarterback
 Steve Blass, Pittsburgh Pirates color commentator on Root Sports Pittsburgh and former Pirates pitcher
 Phil Bourque, color commentator on the Pittsburgh Penguins Radio Network and former Penguins left winger/defensemen
 Steve Byrne, Pittsburgh-native comedian and star of TBS's Sullivan & Son Frank Caliendo, comedian
 Gene Collier, Pittsburgh Post-Gazette columnist and comedian
 Sean Collier, comedian
 Gerry Dulac, Pittsburgh Post-Gazette Steelers writer
 Costaki Economopoulos, comedian
 Bob Errey, Pittsburgh Penguins color analyst on Root Sports Pittsburgh and former Penguins left winger 
 Mitch Fatel, comedian
 Billy Gardell, Pittsburgh-native comedian and star of CBS's Mike & Molly (Appears weekly)
 Craig Gass, comedian
 Bill Hillgrove, Pittsburgh Steelers Radio Network
 Merril Hoge, ESPN NFL analyst and former Pittsburgh Steelers running back
 Tunch Ilkin, Pittsburgh Steelers Radio Network and 970 ESPN
 Bert Kreischer, comedian
 Bob Labriola, Steelers Digest Mike Lange, Pittsburgh Penguins Radio Network
 Mark Madden, 105.9 the X sports talk show host
 Jim McBride, aka Mr. Skin
 Bill Peduto, former Mayor of Pittsburgh
 Tammy Pescatelli, comedian
 Rob Rossi, Pittsburgh Tribune-Review Penguins writer
 Stan Savran, 970 ESPN sports talk show host and host of Pittsburgh Pirates and Penguins' pregame shows on Root Sports Pittsburgh
 Paul Steigerwald, Former Pittsburgh Penguins play-by-play announcer on Root Sports Pittsburgh
 Greg Warren, comedian
 Craig Wolfley, Pittsburgh Steelers Radio Network and 970 ESPN
 Curt Wootton, aka Pittsburgh Dad
 Mike Wysocki, comedian
Additionally, many current and former Pittsburgh Steelers, Penguins and Pirates players tend to appear on the show.

Recurring comedy bits

Note: Names in lists with "Paulsen" and "Krenn" next to them were portrayed by Scott Paulsen and Jim Krenn and can no longer be heard on the show.

Celebrity impersonations
 Gregg Allman (Paulsen)
 Wilford Brimley (Baumann)
 George W. Bush (Krenn)
 Bill Clinton (Paulsen)
 Jerricho Cotchery (Crawford)
 Joe DeNardo (Krenn)
 Mike Emrick (Baumann)
 Morgan Freeman (Baumann)
 Roger Goodell (Paulsen)
 Michael Jackson (Krenn)
 Kim Jong-un (Paulsen)
 Mario Lemieux (Baumann)
 Paul Long (Paulsen)
 Evgeni Malkin (Krenn)
 Sophie Masloff (Krenn)
 Matthew McConaughey (Baumann)
 Pierre McGuire (Prisuta)
 Liam Neeson (Paulsen)
 Robert Nutting (Baumann)
 Barack Obama (Baumann)
 Ed Olczyk (Paulsen)
 Luke Ravenstahl (Crawford)
 Mitt Romney (Baumann)
 Paul Ryan (Paulsen)
 Arnold Schwarzenegger (Baumann)
 Sylvester Stallone (Krenn)
 Martin Straka (Krenn)
 James Taylor (Baumann)
 Mike Tomlin (Baumann)
 Christopher Walken (Crawford)

Original characters/sketches
 Baghdad Bob 
 Tad Bifferson 
 Judge Jimbo Browntown 
 Bustass
 Cosmetic Corner with Bradey and Victor (Krenn and Paulsen) or Bradley and Wendell (Krenn and Baumann) 
 Coyne and Richie, attorneys at law
 Georgie, the die-hard Pittsburgh Steelers fan
 Gunslingers
 J.T. 
 Stanley P. Kachowski, "WDVE station manager" (Krenn)
 Ben Klingston, mall guard
 Liquor World 
 Steely McBeam
 Mullet Talk
 N'at Man and Robert (Paulsen and Krenn)
 72-year-old Otis (Krenn)
 Pants n'at
 Ralph the Cat (Krenn)
 Rollo
 Scorekeeper (Krenn) 
 Siri
 69-year-old Seal (Krenn)
 Spit Chokenpuke (Paulsen)
 Bobby Subgum (Krenn)
 Roy Werner
 Pittsburgh Prom Kings
 Steve's Marijuana
 Teamster Today
 Willie Westshoe (Paulsen)

CD compilations
During the show's run, WDVE has put out many CD compilations of the Morning Show featuring the program's best comedy sketches and interviews and showcasing the many people that have come and gone on the show. Most of these CDs did not remain in print for an extended period of time, and today Morning Show compilations have become collector's items.

Discography

 The Wild & the Innocent (Paulsen and Krenn) (1989)
 Hangin' Out N Nat (Paulsen and Krenn) (1990)
 Drink Me! (Paulsen and Krenn) (1991)
 Ridin' With the Pack (Paulsen and Krenn) (1992)
 DVE TV: Television Without the Picture (Paulsen and Krenn) (1993)
 No Harmful Side Effects (Paulsen and Krenn) (1994)
 Wizards of Odd (Paulsen and Krenn) (1995)
 Twisted (Paulsen and Krenn) (1996)
 Former Altar Boys (Paulsen and Krenn) (1997)
 Almost Live (Paulsen and Krenn) (1998)
 11 (Paulsen and Krenn) (1999)
 He's From Here (Krenn) (2000)
 What a Pair (Krenn and Baumann) (2001)
 Doublewide (Krenn and Baumann) (2002)
 Have a Good One (Krenn and Baumann) (2003)
 Live at Nick's Fat City (Krenn and Baumann) (2004)
 Louder, Harder, Sicker (Krenn and Baumann) (2004)
 Pittsburgh Hold'Em (Krenn and Baumann) (2005)
 Head Trip (Krenn and Baumann) (2006)
 Reloaded (Krenn and Baumann) (2007)
 Last Minute Gift (Baumann) (MP3 only, 2012)

In other media
 In the late 1990s, Scott Paulsen, Jim Krenn and newsreader Cris Winter voiced characters on the Nickelodeon series Action League Now!''

References

External links
 Randy Baumann and the DVE Morning Show blog
 DVE Morning Show podcasts
 Bill Crawford's DVE blog
 Mike Prisuta's DVE blog
 Bill Crawford's official website
 Jim Krenn's official website

1980s American radio programs
1990s American radio programs
2000s American radio programs
2010s American radio programs
American comedy radio programs
Mass media in Pittsburgh